PUC Schools is a charter school operator in Greater Los Angeles. It has its headquarters in Burbank. The charter school systems operates schools in northeast Los Angeles and the northeast San Fernando Valley.

Schools
High schools:
 California Academy for Liberal Studies Early College High School (Los Angeles)
 Community Charter Early College High School (Lake View Terrace, Los Angeles)
 Early College Academy for Leaders and Scholars (eCALS) (Los Angeles)
 Lakeview Charter High School (San Fernando)
 Triumph Charter High School (Sylmar, Los Angeles)

Middle schools:
 California Academy for Liberal Studies Charter Middle School (Los Angeles)
 Community Charter Middle School (Lake View Terrace, Los Angeles)
 Excel Charter Academy (Lincoln Heights, Los Angeles)
 Lakeview Charter Academy (Lake View Terrace, Los Angeles)
 Previously located in San Fernando
 Nueva Esperanza Charter Academy (San Fernando)
 Santa Rosa Charter Academy (Los Angeles)
 Triumph Charter Academy (Sylmar, Los Angeles)
 Previously located in San Fernando

Elementary schools:
 Milagro Charter School (Lincoln Heights, Los Angeles)
 Community Charter Elementary School (Sylmar, Los Angeles)

References

External links

 PUC Schools

Education in California